Lincoln Township is a township in Nodaway County, in the U.S. state of Missouri.

Lincoln Township was erected in 1866, and named after President Abraham Lincoln.

References

Townships in Missouri
Townships in Nodaway County, Missouri